Rubenstein may refer to:
 Alan Rubenstein, British businessman
 Atoosa Rubenstein (born 1972), Iranian-American journalist and editor-in-chief of Seventeen magazine
 David Rubenstein, American co-founder of The Carlyle Group and one of the richest people in the United States
 David Rubenstein (born 1957), American activist and founding Executive Director of the Save Darfur Coalition
 Deidre Rubenstein (born 1948), Australian actress
 Dick Rubenstein, British Army officer
 Glenn Rubenstein (born 1976), American journalist
 Jacob Leon Rubenstein, birth name of Jack Ruby, American murderer of Lee Harvey Oswald
 Louis Rubenstein (1861–1931), Canadian world champion and Hall of Fame figure skater
 Meridel Rubenstein (born 1948), American photographer and installation artist
 Richard L. Rubenstein (1924–2021), American university president and author of theology
 Richard E. Rubenstein (born 1938), American author of historical works
 Shaun Rubenstein (born 1983), South African World Marathon champion canoer
 Steven Rubenstein (1962–2012), American anthropologist
 William Rubenstein (born 1960), American Harvard Law School professor
 Rubenstein Stadium, also known as "Moe Rubenstein Stadium", is a sports stadium in Ambridge, Pennsylvania, in the western suburbs of Pittsburgh, United States

See also
 Anton Rubinstein (1829-1894), Russian composer and pianist
 Arthur Rubinstein (1887-1982), Polish-American pianist
 Rubinstein

German-language surnames
Yiddish-language surnames